Mono Airport is an airport on Stirling Island in the Solomon Islands .

Airlines and destinations

History
Following the Allied invasion of the Northern Solomon Islands on October 25–27, 1943, an airstrip was built on Stirling Island by the 87th Naval Construction Battalion. Stirling Airfield was then used to support a campaign to neutralize Japanese air power at Rabaul.

Also known as "Coronus Strip", the airfield was used by:
 42d Bombardment Group, 20 January–August 1944
 347th Fighter Group, 15 January-15 August 1944
 Special Task Air Group STAG-1 (TDR)
 VMB-413 operating PBJs
 VMD-254 operating PB4Ys
Stirling Airfield is still in use today by the Solomons Airlines.

See also 

 USAAF in the South Pacific

References

 Maurer, Maurer (1983). Air Force Combat Units Of World War II. Maxwell AFB, Alabama: Office of Air Force History. .

External links
Solomon Airlines Routes

Airports in the Solomon Islands
Airfields of the United States Army Air Forces in the Pacific Ocean theatre of World War II